Palestinian Bedouins are a nomadic people who have come to form an organic part of the Palestinian people, characterized by a semi-pastoral and agricultural lifestyle. Originating from the Bi’r as-Saba’/Beersheba region in Southern Historical Palestine, Palestinian Bedouin are now, after various waves of forced displacement, predominantly concentrated in the South (al-Naqab/Negev and Gaza), the North (al-Jalil/Galilee) and in the West Bank. Bedouins have lived in the Bi’r as-Saba’/Naqab region, stretching from Gaza to the Dead Sea, since at least the fifth century. Bi’r as-Saba’, the Naqab, and bilad Gaza are topographic/topological terms used by communities of Southern Palestine. The Bi’r as-Saba’/Naqab Bedouin until recent times referred to themselves as the Arabs of Bi’r as-Saba’ (‘urban al-saba’ or Saba’wi). Remnants of Bedouin communities are also to be found in the Gaza Strip, including 5,000 Bedouins in Om al-Nasr. However in the Gaza strip, the number of true, nomadic Bedouins is shrinking and many are now settled.

Population
In 2005, Bedouin were estimated to amount to 10% of the Palestinian Arab minority in Israel.

As of 2013, approximately 40,000 Bedouin reside in the West Bank, split among the
Jahalin, Ka’abneh, Rashaydeh, Ramadin, ‘Azazme, Communities of Sawarka, Arenat and Amareen.

Overview

Following the creation of Israel in 1948 and the Nakba (Palestinian Catastrophe), most Palestinian Bedouin were expelled to neighboring countries. Only 13,000 out of 95,000 Bedouin remained on their land in the Naqab and Bi’r as-Saba’region. They were confined in a militarized zone northeast of Bi’r as-Saba’ until 1967 and separated from both Jewish and other Palestinian communities. Today more than 300,000 Palestinian Bedouin live in the Naqab and Bi’r as-Saba’ region. They reside in government-planned towns and in villages that the state categorizes as ‘unrecognized’. There are 37 unrecognized Bedouin villages and 11 other villages that only are partially recognized or in the process of being recognized by the Israeli government. The unrecognized villages accommodate a significant component of the community.  The seven government-planned towns were established from the late 1960s onwards in an attempt to forcibly urbanize the Palestinian Bedouin, but most of them resisted relocation, fearing that they would lose their historical villages and land claims. The forced urbanization of the Palestinian Bedouin can be understood as part of Israeli settler colonialism. It aimed at separating the Bedouin from the rest of the Palestinian community and at creating a landless population that would be easier to control, assimilate and ultimately to erase, thus clearing space for new Jewish settlements in the Naqab. Indeed, the forced urbanization process in the Naqab has severely minimized Palestinian Bedouin pastoral and agricultural land use, and endangered their native traditional culture, including rich oral poetry.

Land struggle
Palestinian Bedouins have clear notions of land ownership, and have historically entertained semi-pastoral and agricultural lifestyles. Yet, Orientalist and Israeli scholarship often thinks of them romantically as nomads roaming the desert who are socially and culturally distinctive from the rest of the Palestinian population. Israeli administrative policies further enforce this false image of the Bedouin as a landless nomadic people, denying them their historical land rights, dispossessing and displacing them, exploiting their resources, and settling their land with Jewish Israeli settlers. This has led to a fierce struggle over the land in the Naqab and Bi’r as-Saba’ district.

The Israeli government has formed a number of committees to address the dispute over land ownership in the Naqab, the last being the Prawer Committee formed in 2011. It was headed by Ehud Prawer, Chief of the Policy Planning Department within the Prime Minister’s Office and former deputy head of the National Security Council, but did not include any Bedouin representatives. The Prawer Plan, also called Bill on the Arrangement of Bedouin Settlement in the Negev, was marketed by the government as a plan to improve significantly the lives of the Palestinian Bedouin, but sparked widespread Bedouin resistance. Although purportedly based on the recommendation issued by the Goldberg Commission in 2007, which had recognized the Bedouin’s historical connection to the land and proposed that half of their land claims be granted, the Prawer Plan offered settlement of only less than 27 percent of the claims and did not mention any unrecognized villages.

In 2013 the Prawer Plan was further modified when the ‘Law for the Regulation of Bedouin Settlement in the Negev, ’ or the Prawer-Begin Bill, was approved. Intensive housing demolition followed, and a further 40,000 Bedouin continue to be threatened with expulsion from and demolition of their villages. The Palestinian Bedouin community has met this threat with strong resistance, led by the Regional Council of Unrecognized Villages (RCUV) and other local organizations. Bedouin female and male youth also were key actors in resisting the Prawer Plan. Coalescing in a strong youth movement (al-hirak al-shababi), they used social media tactics and other nonviolent popular forms of resistance, such as protests and demonstrations. Together, these local resistance struggles led to the withdrawal and freezing of the Prawer Plan.

The Palestinian Bedouin resistance movement against forced displacement, house demolitions and land annexation as envisaged by the Prawer Plan has received strong international attention and support. As a result the Palestinian Bedouin are increasingly recognized as an indigenous people of the land, and as an integral part of the Palestinian community.

West Bank Bedouin
The basic units of the West Bank Bedouin are as follows:-

Within the Jordan Valley, many Bedouin communities are located within 30% of Area C which Israel now classifies as military firing zones and whered nearly 6,200 Bedouin live. Numerous villages have been demolished by the IDF, some repeatedly, and rebuilt by the affected Bedouin. Between November 2020 and July 2021, one community, in Humsa al-Baqai’a located in Area C had their hamlet. consisting of 83 structures, including water tanks and solar panels and other infrastructure provided by the European Union, destroyed seven times. The November 2020 demolition, coinciding with the U.S. Elections, displaced 73 Palestinians, among them 41 children, and was the largest demolition carried out in years, according to the United Nations.

Notes

Citations

Sources

Bedouin groups
Palestinian bedouins